José Antonio Rojo García de Alba (born 14 February 1966) is a Mexican politician affiliated with the PRI. As of 2013 he served as Deputy of the LXII Legislature of the Mexican Congress representing Hidalgo.

References

1966 births
Living people
Politicians from Hidalgo (state)
Institutional Revolutionary Party politicians
21st-century Mexican politicians
Universidad Autónoma del Estado de Hidalgo alumni
Members of the Congress of Hidalgo
20th-century Mexican politicians
Deputies of the LXII Legislature of Mexico
Members of the Chamber of Deputies (Mexico) for Hidalgo (state)